Altamira is a port city on the Gulf of Mexico and is located near the southeastern tip of the state of Tamaulipas in Mexico. It is the second-largest city in the municipality of Altamira. To the south is Tampico, also in this state.

The city is part of the Tampico Metropolitan Area. Its port business is mostly containerized cargo for ocean-going ships. According to the INEGI 2010 census, the city has a population of 59,536, the tenth-largest in the state.

References

Populated places in Tamaulipas
Mexico
Ports of the Gulf of Mexico